Prince Valium is the only studio album by American rock band Medication.

Track listing
All songs by Medication except for "Underground", written by Jessicka.
Loaded Gun – 2:40
Nothing Left – 2:52
Something New – 4:38
Walk Away – 3:17
No Direction – 3:01
Underground – 3:46
False Idol – 2:32
Xanax – 4:51
Super Pop – 3:36
Now and Again – 3:22
Prince Valium – 3:31
End of Ends – 2:46
Inside – 6:03

Personnel 
Whitfield Crane – vocals
Logan Mader – guitar, vocals
Kyle Sanders – bass
B. Blunt – guitar, vocals
Josh Freese – drums

External links
Prince Valium at AllMusic

Medication (band) albums
2002 debut albums